Ernest Piggott (1878–1967) was a leading British jump racing jockey, whose family has become one of the leading dynasties in British horseracing. He was three times Champion Jockey and three times Grand National winner. His son, (Ernest) Keith Piggott (1904–1993), was also a leading jump jockey and National-winning trainer, while his grandson was the 11-times British flat racing Champion Jockey, Lester Piggott.

Jockey Championships
Piggott began his English riding career in the late 1890s but from 1905 was based for several years in Belgium and France. He was champion jockey in France before returning to England where he won the 1910 British jump jockey championship with 67 winners. At the time this was the joint-record number of winners, although it was superseded the following year. His two other championships came in 1913 and 1915.

Grand National
His first Grand National victory came in 1912 on 4/1 joint favourite, Jerry M, trained by Robert Gore and owned by Sir Charles Assheton-Smith. Although this trainer-owner pair won the following year's National with Covertcoat, Piggott was not on board, and it wasn't until 1918, when the Grand National was held at Gatwick (as Aintree had been commandeered by the War Office) that Piggott got a follow-up success with Poethlyn. The same horse gave him his third and final National victory back at Aintree in 1919 when it went off 11/4 favourite, the shortest priced winner in the history of the race. In so doing, he became the first jockey to win three Grand Nationals since Arthur Nightingall in 1901. This made it the oldest horse ever to have been placed in the National up to that point, and it remains the only horse ever to have been placed carrying such a weight. He retired from the saddle in 1920 and trained for twenty years at Letcombe Regis from the following year, dying in hospital at Oxford on 13 March 1967 aged 88.

Personal life

Ernest married Margaret Cannon, daughter of jockey, Tom Cannon, Sr.

See also
 List of significant families in British horse racing

References

External links
 Jerry M, Piggott's first National winner
  1919 Grand National, British Pathe footage

1878 births
1967 deaths
People from Nantwich
British jockeys
British Champion jumps jockeys